SPMT can mean:

Serial Port Memory Technology, a coalition of companies involved in designing and manufacturing mobile devices, integrated circuits, and semiconductor IP.
 Self-propelled modular transporter, a platform vehicle with a large array of wheels on the bottom. 
Speculative multithreading, a dynamic parallelization technique that depends on out-of-order execution to achieve speedup on multiprocessor CPUs.